Haha or ha ha is an onomatopoeic representation of laughter. 

Haha and variants may also refer to:

People 
 Ha Ha Clinton-Dix (born 1992), American football player
 Haha (entertainer) (born 1979), Entertainer

Places 
 Saint-Louis-du-Ha! Ha!
 Ha! Ha! River (Gros-Mécatina), Côte-Nord, Quebec, Canada
 Ha! Ha! River (Saguenay River), Saguenay, Quebec, Canada
 Lake Ha! Ha!, a lake in Canada
 Ha Ha Bay, a bay on the island of Newfoundland, Canada
 Raleigh, Newfoundland and Labrador, Canada, a town originally known as Ha Ha Bay after the above
 Haha-jima, an island of Japan

Other uses
 Ha-ha, a recessed landscape barrier
 Haha (tribe), a Moroccan Berber ethnic group
 "(Ha Ha) Slow Down", a song by Fat Joe, 2010
 Mother (1963 film) or Haha, a Japanese film
 Ha Ha, a  millionaire racehorse in Australia
 Hāhā, several species of Hawaiian plants, including those of the genus Cyanea
 "Ha ha!", a catchphrase used by character Nelson Muntz on the television series The Simpsons

See also 
 Ha Ha Ha (disambiguation)
 Ho ho ho (disambiguation)
 Lord Haw-Haw, the nickname of several announcers on the English language propaganda radio programme Germany Calling, broadcast by Nazi Germany